Aiman El-Shewy (born 3 February 1968) is an Egyptian judoka. He competed in the men's half-heavyweight event at the 1992 Summer Olympics.

References

External links
 

1968 births
Living people
Egyptian male judoka
Olympic judoka of Egypt
Judoka at the 1992 Summer Olympics
Place of birth missing (living people)
20th-century Egyptian people
21st-century Egyptian people
African Games medalists in judo
Competitors at the 1991 All-Africa Games
African Games gold medalists for Egypt